The 69151/69152 Valsad–Surat MEMU is a MEMU train of the Indian Railways connecting  and  of Gujarat. It is currently being operated with 69151/69152 train numbers on a daily basis.

Service

69151/Valsad–Surat MEMU has average speed of 34 km/hr and covers 69 km in 2 hrs.
69152/Surat–Valsad MEMU has average speed of 33 km/hr and covers 69 km in 2 hrs 5 min.

Route 

Coach composition

The train consists of 20 MEMU rake coaches.

Rake sharing

The train shares its rake with 69153/69154 Umargam Road–Valsad MEMU and 69111/69112 Surat–Vadodara MEMU.

External links 

 69151/Valsad-Surat MEMU India Rail Info
 69152/Surat-Valsad MEMU India Rail Info

References 

Transport in Valsad
Transport in Surat
Electric multiple units in Gujarat